Upper Kuttanad is a part of  India's Kuttanad region.  It consists of parts of Kottayam, Pathanamthitta, and Alapuzha districts.

Kuttanad is broadly divided into Lower Kuttanad (Taluks of Ambalapuzha and Kuttanad in Alappuzha district), Upper Kuttanad (some parts of Kuttanad, and Karthikapally Taluks in Alappuzha district, western parts of Tiruvalla taluk in Pathanamthitta district), and North Kuttanad (Taluks of Vaikom, and western parts of Changanacherry and Kottayam taluks in Kottayam district.)

Some villages in Upper Kuttanad are Edathua, Thalavady, Muttar, Veeyapuram, Peringara, chathenkary, Nedumbram, Niranam, Kadapra, Parumala, Mannar and Pallippad .

There is a demand for an Upper Kuttanad taluk (administrative subdivision) with Edathua as headquarters.

Regions of Kerala